USCGC Henry Blake (WLM-563) is a United States Coast Guard  based out of Naval Station Everett in Everett, WA.

Henry Blake was built by the Marinette Marine Corporation in 1998 and launched in 1999 out of Marinette, WI. The 13th of 14 Keeper-class cutters, the Henry Blake is one of the most advanced cutters currently in the United States Coast Guard's fleet. The name Henry Blake originates from the first New Dungeness Lighthouse keeper Henry Blake. All 14 Keeper-class cutters are named after lighthouse keepers. Thus Henry Blakes motto is "Keeper of the Tradition."

Henry Blakes primary mission is the maintenance of over 235 aids to navigation in the Puget Sound area and along the coast of Washington. Secondary missions include marine environmental protection, search and rescue, and homeland security.

Advanced equipment
Henry Blake contains advanced navigational and mechanical equipment. Five primary systems are noteworthy, allowing for the crew to be dramatically reduced in size compared to a traditional cutter.
 Machinery Plant Control and Monitoring System (MPCMS) - a computer program embedded into every piece of electrical and mechanical equipment on board the ship. Allows for crew members to remotely monitor and operate everything from pumps, generators, and engines from one of three terminals on board.
 Electronic Chart Positioning and Information System (ECPINS) - one of the primary mode of navigation, ECPINS provides updated and detailed electronic versions of paper navigational charts anywhere in the world. The position of the Henry Blake is then updated and displayed upon the charts using Differential GPS (DGPS), making navigation increasingly accurate and reliable.
 Dynamic Positioning System (DPS) - gives the Henry Blake the ability to hold any given position in the water even in heavy currents, winds, and swells. Extremely useful in safely bringing buoys aboard that can sometimes weigh an excess of 16,000 lbs. Also allows the vessel to follow a preset trackline without the need for a helmsman.
 Z-Drive Propulsion- replaces conventional fixed propellers and rudders with two propulsion housings with the ability to rotate 360 degrees independently of one another. Henry Blake therefore enjoys unsurpassed maneuverability in the maritime world and allows for the DPS to hold an exact position.
 Side Scan Sonar - creates a picture of the seabed surrounding the vessel to warn bridge personnel of potential hazards. Because Henry Blake often operates in dangerous shoal waters and close to hazards to navigation in order to service buoys, such a piece of equipment is vital to keep the vessel safe but is only used when absolutely needed because of the ship's environmentally conscious policy.

External links 
USCG Fact Sheet
Henry Blake Using Bio-Fuel

Keeper-class cutters
1999 ships
Ships built by Marinette Marine